Hemiancistrus medians is a species of catfish in the family Loricariidae. It is native to South America, where it occurs in the Maroni basin. This species is usually found in rapids with a strong current and a substrate of large, shelter-providing rocks. It is known to coexist with the species Bryconops caudomaculatus, Chasmocranus longior, Harttia surinamensis, Hypostomus gymnorhynchus, Jupiaba meunieri, Leporinus granti, and Parodon guyanensis. 

This species is large for a loricariid, reaching 39 cm (15.4 inches) in total length.

References 

Ancistrini
Fish described in 1854